Ellen Hart Peña (born May 19, 1958) is an American lawyer and former athlete.

Career 
Peña competed in the 1980 U.S. Olympic Trials 10,000 meter run and the 1984 U.S. Olympic Trials marathon. Unfortunately, due to the boycott of the Moscow games by the United States, she did not get to compete at the Olympics in 1980. She won five world titles before the end of her professional athletic career.

Peña earned her Bachelor of Arts degree from Harvard University in 1980 and earned a Juris Doctor from the University of Colorado Law School. From 1990 to 1992, she served as Executive Director of the Community Action Program at the University of Denver, a service learning program. She worked as an attorney with the Denver firm of Morrison & Foerster from 1988 to 1990.

A made-for-TV movie based on Peña's life was produced in 1996. Called Dying to be Perfect: The Ellen Hart Peña Story, Peña was portrayed by Crystal Bernard. The plot centers around her running career, relationship with her husband, and battle with anorexia and bulimia. Peña also served on the President's Council on Sports, Fitness, and Nutrition.

Since recovering and going public with her struggle, Peña has given lectures and speeches on eating disorders focusing on her own personal experiences.

Personal life 
In 1988, Peña married Federico Peña, a politician who served as the Mayor of Denver from 1983 to 1991 and the United States Secretary of Transportation from 1993 to 1997 in the Clinton Administration. He also served as the United States Secretary of Energy from 1997 to 1998. The couple had three children together before divorcing in 2001.

References

External links
profile

1958 births
Living people
21st-century American women
American female long-distance runners
American women lawyers
First ladies of Denver
Harvard University alumni
People associated with Morrison & Foerster
Track and field athletes from Denver
University of Colorado Law School alumni